Elefthero may refer to the following places in Greece:

Elefthero, Grevena, part of the municipality Grevena in the Grevena regional unit
Elefthero Prosfygon, part of the municipality Grevena in the Grevena regional unit
Elefthero, Ioannina, part of the municipality Konitsa in the Ioannina regional unit